Didier Drogba is a former professional association footballer who represented the Ivory Coast national team from 2002 to 2014. He made his debut for the Ivory Coast in a 2004 African Cup of Nations qualification match against South Africa in September 2002. He scored his first international goal on his next appearance for the Ivory Coast, in a 3–0 win against Cameroon in a friendly in Châteauroux, France. On 8 August 2014, Drogba announced his retirement from international football with a record of 65 goals in 105 appearances, ending his international career as his country's all-time top scorer, remaining so , and with the third-most appearances, behind Didier Zokora (123) and Kolo Touré (120).

Drogba scored one hat-trick during his international career, scoring the opening three goals in a 6–1 victory for the Ivory Coast against Burundi in a 2004 African Cup of Nations qualification match. He has also scored a goal twice in a match on twelve occasions, including one against Senegal in October 2012; the game was abandoned shortly after Drogba's second goal as fans rioted, throwing food and drinks onto the pitch, although the Confederation of African Football declared the 2–0 victory would stand. He has scored more goals against Benin (seven) than any other country. Nineteen of his goals were scored in his hometown stadium of Stade Félix Houphouët-Boigny in Abidjan. Fourteen of Drogba's goals were scored from the penalty spot.

Drogba scored more international goals in friendlies than in any other format, with 23 in 42 matches. He scored eighteen goals in FIFA World Cup qualifiers at almost one goal per game (nineteen matches), and two goals at the World Cup finals. In the Africa Cup of Nations, he scored eleven goals in twelve qualifying matches, and eleven goals in twenty-four matches at the tournaments. As of September 2020, he is the 22nd highest men's international goal scorer of all time, and third highest scorer for an African nation, behind Godfrey Chitalu and Kinnah Phiri.

International goals
Ivory Coast listed first, score column indicates score after each Drogba goal.

Hat-tricks

Statistics

References

External links
Didier Drogba at Ivorian Football Federation

Drogba
Drogba